Malagazziidae is a family of hydrozoans.

Genera 
The following genera are recognized within the family Malagazziidae:

 Octocanna Haeckel, 1879 (nomen dubium)
 Octophialucium Kramp, 1955
 Malagazzia Bouillon, 1984
 Tetracanna Goy, 1979

References 

 
Leptothecata
Cnidarian families